Enrique Raymondi (born 5 December 1937) is an Ecuadorian footballer. He played in five matches for the Ecuador national football team in 1963, scoring three goals. He was also part of Ecuador's squad for the 1963 South American Championship.

References

1937 births
Living people
Ecuadorian footballers
Ecuador international footballers
Association football forwards
Sportspeople from Guayaquil